Scene of the Crime may refer to:

Films
Scene of the Crime (1949 film), starring Van Johnson
Scene of the Crime (1986 film), a French film directed by André Téchiné
Scene of the Crime (1996 film), also known as Ladykiller
Scenes of the Crime, a 2001 film directed by Dominique Forma

Television
Scene of the Crime (1984 TV series), a 1984-1985 series of one-hour NBC mystery specials hosted by Orson Welles
Scene of the Crime (TV series), a 1991-1992 U.S. television mystery anthology series broadcast on CBS

S.O.C.O. (Scene of the Crime Operatives), a Philippine reality series

Other uses
 Crime Scene (disambiguation)
The Scene of the Crime, a 2007 album by Bettye LaVette
"Scene of the Crime", a song by the band Ratt
Scene of the Crime (comics), limited series comic book published by DC Comics
Scene of the Crime Operations, the forensic arm of the Philippine National Police
 "The Scene of the Crime", a 1990 song by Jo-El Sonnier
Scene of the Crime, a 1986 prototype video game for the Control-Vision which inspired the 1992 video game Night Trap